Oxymacaria ceylonica is a moth of the family Geometridae first described by George Hampson in 1902. It is found in Sri Lanka.

References

Moths of Asia
Moths described in 1902